, also known as My Recently Hired Maid Is Suspicious, is a Japanese manga series written and illustrated by Wakame Konbu. The series debuted as a webcomic in 2019 before it began serialization in Square Enix's Monthly Gangan Joker magazine in January 2020. The series has been compiled into six tankōbon volumes as of September 2022. An anime television series adaptation by Silver Link and Blade aired from July to October 2022.

Characters

 The main male protagonist. A young boy from a rich family, Yuuri lost his parents due to a car accident and is later taken care by his mysterious new maid Lilith. He is frequently in his father's old office, regardless of his activity. A running gag is Yuuri not realizing he has fallen for Lilith, where he calls any action she makes as suspicious while unintentionally revealing his attraction to her; all of which fluster her and endear him to Lilith.

 The main female protagonist. She is a mysterious and beautiful, dark skin maid with sparkling purple eyes. She has two moles under her right eye and a mole on one side of her breasts. Having a connection with Yuuri's family in the past, she left her previous employer to take care of Yuuri after the death of his parents. A running gag for Lilith is she tries to tease Yuuri's by making the young boy embarrassed only to be embarrassed herself due to the latter's unintentional confessions of attraction for Lilith. Lilith's age is never stated, but she is a teenager.

 A young, rich girl and classmate of Yuuri. A fan of romance manga and novels, she supports the "forbidden relationship" between Yuuri's and his maid. It takes her two blunt explanations to get the fact Yuuri loves Lilith, to his face to get the fact to stick.

 Tsukasa's female butler who was a classmate of Lilith in highschool. She constantly deal with Tsukasa's love of romance fiction much to her chagrin. She regularly threatens to quit when Tsukasa tries to get her to dress in feminine clothes.

 Another maid and colleague of Lilith's who tries to bring her back to their current employer.

Media

Manga
Written and illustrated by Wakame Konbu, The Maid I Hired Recently Is Mysterious debuted as a webcomic in 2019 before it began serialization in Square Enix's shōnen manga magazine Monthly Gangan Joker on January 22, 2020. As of September 2022, six tankōbon volumes have been released. In North America, Yen Press has licensed the series for English publication.

Volume list

Anime
An anime television series adaptation was announced on May 17, 2022. It was produced by Silver Link and Blade, with Misuzu Hoshino directing the series, Mirai Minato serving as chief director and handling the scripts, Machi Yoshino designing the characters, and Kōji Fujimoto and Osamu Sasaki composing the music. The series aired from July 24 to October 9, 2022, on ABC and TV Asahi's  programming block. The opening theme song is  performed by ≠Me, while the ending theme song is  performed by Yui Horie. Crunchyroll has licensed the series and they streamed it along with an English dub.

Episode list

Reception
In 2020, the manga was nominated for the 6th Next Manga Awards in the print category and ranked 9th out of 50 nominees.

See also 
The Great Jahy Will Not Be Defeated! — Another manga series by the same author.

Notes

References

External links
Manga official website 
Anime official website 

Asahi Broadcasting Corporation original programming
Crunchyroll anime
Gangan Comics manga
Romantic comedy anime and manga
Shōnen manga
Silver Link
Yen Press titles